Fock is a Swedish and Baltic German noble family originally from Westphalia, Holy Roman Empire, from where members relocated to Sweden, Estonia and Latvia. In 1651 four brothers were naturalised as Swedish nobility, from which three freiherr (baron) cadet branches were issued.

References 

Swedish noble families